Laure Thibaud (born 2 July 1978) is a French former synchronized swimmer.

Synchronized swimming
Thibaud joined the National Team in 2000, after the Sydney Games.

Thibaud competed at the 2002 European Aquatics Championships and 2003 World Aquatics Championships. She won a bronze medal at the 2004 European Aquatics Championships with Virginie Dedieu and they finished 5th at the 2004 Summer Olympics.

Thibaud retired after the Athens 2004 Games at the age of 26. She is now technical advisor of the North-East of France for FINA.

References

1978 births
Living people
Sportspeople from Nîmes
French synchronized swimmers
Olympic synchronized swimmers of France
Synchronized swimmers at the 2004 Summer Olympics